A designated place is a type of geographic unit used by Statistics Canada to disseminate census data. It is usually "a small community that does not meet the criteria used to define incorporated municipalities or Statistics Canada population centres (areas with a population of at least 1,000 and no fewer than 400 persons per square kilometre)." Provincial and territorial authorities collaborate with Statistics Canada in the creation of designated places so that data can be published for sub-areas within municipalities. Starting in 2016, Statistics Canada allowed the overlapping of designated places with population centres.

At the 2021 Census of Population, Alberta had 311 designated places, an increase from 304 in 2011. Designated place types in Alberta include 18 dissolved municipalities, 10 Métis settlements, and 283 unincorporated places. In 2021, the 311 designated places had a cumulative population of 78,571 and an average population of 253. Alberta's largest designated place is Langdon with a population of 5,497.

List

Retired designated places 
T & E Trailer Park, located within the City of Grande Prairie, was last recognized as a designated place in the 2006 Census of Canada.

See also 
List of census agglomerations in Alberta
List of census divisions of Alberta
List of communities in Alberta
List of hamlets in Alberta
List of localities in Alberta
List of municipalities in Alberta
List of population centres in Alberta

Notes

References 

 
Designated places